The Jennetal (the suffix -tal means dale) is a valley cut in the Schönberg mountain and also the name of a nature reserve, where it's located.

Location
The Jennetal is located on the southwestern slope of the Schönberg, directly above Ebringen, at an altitude of about 1,100-1,475 ft (340-450 m) above sea level.

History

Sumser's Garden
In 1931 Erwin Sumser purchased several lots of land in the Jennetal which he himself converted into a nature reserve. Upon his initiative, this nature reserve of originally 0,7095 ha became an officially protected area in 1937. In 1960 he sold this area, which is commonly called Sumser's Garden, along with his other private nature reserves on the Baar, to the federal state of Baden-Württemberg.

Extension of the area
In 1996 the nature reserve Jennetal was extended to nearly 23 ha.

Flora

Trees
Among others: common hornbeam, sessile oak, downy oak, hawberry, chequer tree, service tree

Plants
Outstanding species: orchids, himantoglossums

References

External links
 Map of the nature reserve Jennetal

Geography of Baden-Württemberg
Breisgau-Hochschwarzwald
Baden
Nature reserves in Baden-Württemberg
Protected areas established in 1937
IUCN Category IV